In abstract algebra, a subset  of a field  is algebraically independent over a subfield  if the elements of  do not satisfy any non-trivial polynomial equation with coefficients in .

Example

However, the set  is not algebraically independent over the rational numbers, because the nontrivial polynomial

Algebraic independence of known constants
Although both  and e are known to be transcendental,
In fact, it is not even known if  is irrational.
Nesterenko proved in 1996 that:

Lindemann–Weierstrass theorem

Algebraic matroids

Further, all the maximal algebraically independent subsets have the same cardinality, known as the transcendence degree of the extension.

A matroid that can be generated in this way is called an algebraic matroid. No good characterization of algebraic matroids is known, but certain matroids are known to be non-algebraic; the smallest is the Vámos matroid.

Many finite matroids may be represented by a matrix over a field , in which the matroid elements correspond to matrix columns, and a set of elements is independent if the corresponding set of columns is linearly independent. Every matroid with a linear representation of this type may also be represented as an algebraic matroid, by choosing an indeterminate for each row of the matrix, and by using the matrix coefficients within each column to assign each matroid element a linear combination of these transcendentals. The converse is false: not every algebraic matroid has a linear representation.

References

External links

Abstract algebra
Matroid theory